Jannik Olander is a Danish-American jewelry designer and television personality.

Early life and education 
Olander was born and raised in Denmark. By the age of 19, Olander moved to London, and then moved to California, in 2008. Olander received his bachelor's degree in 2006 from Copenhagen Business School.

Career 
Olander started his career at Harvey Nichols, where he worked as a sales assistant before he moved to Munich and began working as a manager at Polo Ralph Lauren then in Hamburg as a manager for the Polo Ralph Lauren flagship store. seven years in Europe to open his own Ralph Lauren store in Illum. He later founded his company, "Gorilla t-shirts." and then founded Nialaya Jewelry and where he designed and created beaded macramé necklaces and bracelets and opens now through its shop in the Melrose Avenue shopping district. He has designed jewelry for several celebrities including, Usher, Paris Hilton, Beyoncé and Sean Combs. 

In 2014, Olander appeared on the American reality documentary television series aired on Bravo TV, Euros of Hollywood.

References

External links 
 Nialaya website

American people of Danish descent
Jewellery designers
Year of birth missing (living people)
Living people